The Brixia Tour was an Italian cycle road race held annually in the province of Brescia, Lombardy. Since 2005, the race has been organised as a 2.1 event on the UCI Europe Tour.

List of winners

References

External links
Official site 

Cycle races in Italy
Recurring sporting events established in 2001
2001 establishments in Italy
UCI Europe Tour races
Defunct cycling races in Italy
Recurring sporting events disestablished in 2011
2011 disestablishments in Italy
Sport in Lombardy